The Fabulous Country Music Sound of George Jones is the 1962 country music compilation album released by George Jones in August 1962. the album compiled a series of previously-released tracks. It contains songs dated back to 1955 while with Starday, to his second #1 hit with Mercury in 1960.

This album, compiled by Starday, contained many of former Mercury-Starday recordings, many previously unissued. The lead track, "Window Up Above" was recorded by Johnny Paycheck or "Donny Young." Though the album did not chart, it is noteworthy for containing many of formerly unheard of Jones songs.

Background
During the 1960s, Starday Records (now completely absorbed by Mercury) began repackaging multiple unissued songs onto 12-track LP's, that would also include some hits. This album, The Fabulous Country Music Sound, was the first of these LP's, and was produced by former Starday president, Don Pierce.

Track listing
"Yes I Know Why (I Want to Cry)" (Webb Pierce)
"Wasted Words" (George Jones)
"Window Up Above" (George Jones)
"Heartbreak Hotel" (Mae Boren Axton, Tommy Durden, Elvis Presley)
"Go Away With Me" (Dan Welch)
"No Money in This Deal" (George Jones)
"Sweet Dreams" (Don Gibson)
"Accidentally On Purpose" (George Jones, Darrell Edwards)
"Any Old Time" (Jimmy Rodgers)
"Who Shot Sam" (George Jones, Darrell Edwards, Ray Jackson)
"I Take the Chance" (Charlie Louvin, Ira Louvin)
"Rain Keeps A-Fallin''" (George Jones)

1962 albums
George Jones albums
Starday Records albums